Otkritie Bank Arena, also known as Spartak Stadium (the stadium's official name during the 2017 FIFA Confederations Cup and 2018 FIFA World Cup), is a multi-purpose stadium north-west of Moscow, Russia. The venue is used mostly for football matches, hosting the home matches of Spartak Moscow. 

The stadium is designed with a capacity of 45,360 people. It has been used for select matches of Russian national football team.

History

The groundbreaking ceremony was held on 2 July 2007, but construction was delayed multiple times because of administration delays, location peculiarities and the world financial and economic crisis. Construction was scheduled to be completed between 2009 and 2010 but, as of 2009, the stadium was still in the design stage. In 2010, the stadium project underwent revision because it was rejected by an architectural council that found the project too ordinary. The current design was developed by AECOM, in association with Sport Concepts, and façade designer, Dexter Moren Associates adjacent to a separate indoor arena. The main financing of the construction came from the club's owner Leonid Fedun through affiliated companies LUKoil company and IFD Kapital.

With the construction of the stadium in 2015, the Moscow Metro station Spartak, which had been completed in 1975, opened for passenger traffic. On 19 February 2013 it was announced that the new stadium will be named "Otkrytiye Arena" for six years under the terms of the contract with Otkrytiye Bank. On August 27, 2014 the Spartak Metro Station was opened. On the same day President of Russia Vladimir Putin, Deputy Prime Minister of Russia Vitaly Mutko, Prime Minister of Russia Dmitry Medvedev and Mayor of Moscow Sergey Sobyanin visited the stadium. On 21 August 2014, a monument to the Starostin brothers, the founders of FC Spartak Moscow, opened near the north stands inside the stadium. A 24.5-meter sculpture of the Roman gladiator Spartacus, for whom the club is named, was unveiled in the square outside the stadium.

The stadium officially opened on 5 September 2014. Spartak played a friendly football match against Red Star Belgrade and drew 1–1, with Dmitri Kombarov scoring the first goal for Spartak at the new stadium after a free-kick. On October 12, 2015, a bronze statue of the Spartak and USSR national team player Fyodor Cherenkov was inaugurated next to the stadium.
The stadium was constructed on the site of the Tushino Airport. The new stadium was included in Russia's bid for the 2018 FIFA World Cup, hosting the opening game, with Luzhniki Stadium slated to host the final. The stadium was completed ahead of VTB Arena, which originally was planned for the World Cup opener. It was also one of four stadiums used for the 2017 FIFA Confederations Cup. Artists such as Incubus, Triggerfinger (Park Live 2015) have all performed at the stadium.

Available at the stadium are navigation assistance from volunteers, storage rooms, registration of children, lost and found office. Two sectors with 50 seats each are available for people with disabilities. This part of the arena is furnished with ramps and elevators. In 2018 the stadium won the nomination for the best stadium in Russia.

2017 FIFA Confederations Cup

2018 FIFA World Cup

Concerts 
 June 19, 2015 - Park Live Festival - Muse, Incubus, Triggerfinger
 June 19, 2016 - Rammstein
 July 9, 2016 - Park Live Festival - Red Hot Chili Peppers, The Kills, Nothing But Thieves
 July 10, 2016 - Park Live Festival - Lana Del Rey, John Newman, Passenger, Two Door Cinema Club
 July 13, 2017 – Leningrad
 July 15, 2017 – Depeche Mode – Global Spirit Tour
 July 13, 2018 – Guns N' Roses – Not in This Lifetime... Tour
 June 29, 2019 – Time Machine
 July 19, 2019 – Ed Sheeran – ÷ Tour

Security 
In preparation for the 2018 FIFA World Cup, the stadium was outfitted with video surveillance and fan identification systems and screening equipment. Security measures have been developed by the 2018 World Cup Local Organising Committee, Ministry of Internal Affairs and Federal Security Service in collaboration with the stadium services.

References

External links

 
 Section on the official site of Spartak about the stadium with renders of the stadium
 Article on the official website of Spartak with pictures of the current design of the stadium as of December 2010

FC Spartak Moscow
Football venues in Russia
Sports venues in Moscow
Music venues in Russia
Multi-purpose stadiums in Russia
Sports venues completed in 2014
2018 FIFA World Cup stadiums
2017 FIFA Confederations Cup stadiums
2014 establishments in Russia